Viktor Ravnik (born 19 October 1941) is a Slovenian ice hockey player. He competed in the men's tournaments at the 1964 Winter Olympics, the 1968 Winter Olympics and the 1972 Winter Olympics.

References

1941 births
Living people
Slovenian ice hockey defencemen
Olympic ice hockey players of Yugoslavia
Ice hockey players at the 1964 Winter Olympics
Ice hockey players at the 1968 Winter Olympics
Ice hockey players at the 1972 Winter Olympics
Sportspeople from Jesenice, Jesenice
Yugoslav ice hockey defencemen
HK Acroni Jesenice players
KHL Medveščak Zagreb players